Cristiano Gomes may refer to:
Cristiano Gomes (footballer, born 1985), Brazilian footballer
Cristiano Gomes (footballer, born 1994), Portuguese footballer